Moravian sugar cake is a sweet coffee cake that is often made in areas around Moravian Church settlements, particularly in Pennsylvania and North Carolina. It is made with a sweet yeast dough enriched with mashed potatoes. The dough is left to rise in a flat pan, and just before baking, deep wells are formed in the surface of the dough with the finger tips, and a mixture of melted butter, brown sugar, and cinnamon is poured on top. During baking, this forms a rich sugary crust that permeates deep into the interior of the cake. Moravian sugar cake is best served warm from the oven, but it keeps at room temperature for several days, and also freezes well.

History
The Moravian settlers who came to North Carolina in 1753 and founded Salem in 1766 brought this recipe with them from eastern Pennsylvania and their settlements there. Moravian sugar cake is very similar to the German Zuckerkuchen (i.e. sugar cake) made in Berlin and Butterkuchen (butter cake) in Lüneburg.  Inclusion of mashed potatoes in the dough may have derived from the practice of using potatoes in dough starters to boost the growth of natural yeasts. Often made for Holy Week and Easter, its popularity soon led to its appearance at other holidays and festive occasions, especially Christmas. Over the centuries, the recipe for Moravian sugar cake has changed little, and its renown has spread far beyond Winston-Salem so that it has become a beloved North Carolina breakfast confection. Freshly baked sugar cake is available at stores and bakeries in Winston-Salem and across the N.C. Piedmont region.

See also
 List of cakes
 List of foods of the Southern United States
 Moravian Church
 Old Salem

References

External links
  Moravian Sugar Cake. Three Yummy Recipes; Waconia Moravian Church; accessed 11/12/2017
  Winkler's Moravian Sugar Cake; American Food Roots; March 25, 2013; accessed 11/12/2017

Cakes
Christian cuisine
Cuisine of the Southern United States
Moravian Church
Moravian settlement in North Carolina
Moravian settlement in Pennsylvania
North Carolina cuisine